Mark Knowles and Xavier Malisse were the defending champions but Knowles did not participate this year because of his retirement from professional tennis in September 2012.
Malisse played alongside Frank Moser and successfully defended the title, defeating Lleyton Hewitt and Marinko Matosevic in the final 6–0, 6–7(5–7), [10–4].

Seeds

Draw

Draw

External links
 Main draw

SAP Open- Doubles
2013 Doubles
2013 SAP Open